The 2021 season was Kuching City's sixth year in their history and second season in the Malaysia Premier League since 2020 following promotion 2019 season. Along with the league, the club will also compete in the Malaysia Cup.

Events
On 1 December 2020, the club announced Irfan Bakti as club's head coach on one-year contract.

On 21 January 2021, the players started training with club's new head coach, Irfan Bakti.

On 24 July 2021, the league match against Terengganu II has been postponed due to COVID-19 cases among Kuching City players and officials.

On 12 January 2021, Alemão joined the club from Kelantan United. Hudson Dias, Leo and Yuta Suzuki have been retained from last season. Joseph Kalang Tie has been appointed as club's captain.

On 25 February 2021, Leo has been released from the club due to injury.

On 18 June 2021, Michael Ijezie joined the club from Langkawi City. Bryan has been released from the club upon mutual agreement.

Players

First-team squad

Technical staff

Competitions

Malaysia Premier League

League table

Matches

Malaysia Cup

Group stage

The draw for the group stage was held on 15 September 2021.

Statistics

Appearances and goals

|-
! colspan="16" style="background:#dcdcdc; text-align:center"| Players transferred out during the season

|}

References

Kuching City F.C. seasons
Kuching City